Gregory Mitchell is the current alderman of Chicago's 7th ward. He took office in 2015 with 57% of the vote. He has a degree from Grambling State University.

Aldermanic career
Mitchell was first elected alderman in 2015, unseating incumbent Natashia Holmes. He was subsequently reelected in 2019.

In the runoff of the 2019 Chicago mayoral election, Mitchell endorsed Toni Preckwinkle.

References

External links
 Aldermanic page

1969 births
21st-century American politicians
African-American people in Illinois politics
Chicago City Council members
Illinois Democrats
Grambling State University alumni
Living people
21st-century African-American politicians
20th-century African-American people